The Source Hip Hop Music Awards 2000 is a music compilation album contributed by The Source magazine.  Released August 15, 2000 and distributed by Def Jam Recordings, Hip Hop Music Awards 2000 is the second annual album produced by the magazine to focus on its nominees of the now-defunct award show.  It features seventeen hip hop and rap hits.  It went to number 16 on the Top R&B/Hip Hop Albums chart and peaked at number 17 on the Billboard 200 album chart.

This is the only The Source compilation overall that does not have a number one Hot Rap Tracks hit.

Track listing
Credits adapted from Discogs.

Charts

Weekly charts

References

Hip hop compilation albums
2000 compilation albums